Alfred Ingram (1876–1944) was a British tennis player in the years before and after World war 1. He played in the Wimbledon singles from 1912 to 1926. His best performance at Wimbledon was a quarter final in 1913 (where he lost to Maurice McLoughlin).  His daughter Peggy played at Wimbledon (Alfred and Peggy played mixed doubles together at Wimbledon).

References

1876 births
1944 deaths
English male tennis players
British male tennis players
Tennis people from Berkshire